Apostrophe (formerly known as UberWriter) is an open-source, minimalist markdown text editor, that Wolf Vollprecht develops. Apostrophe supports formatting with Markdown. It was originally created for the Ubuntu App Showdown, and has since received recognition as one of the Top 10 Ubuntu Apps of 2012.

History 

Developer Wolf Vollprecht credited the Mac application iA Writer as being the inspiration for UberWriter, and has expressed his wish to see the two programs become compatible:

A lot of inspiration for UberWriter comes from iA Writer, which is (sadly) only available for Mac OS X users to this date. However, if you like UberWriter and own a mac, please consider buying iA Writer as I do not want to do any harm to them.
I actually would really like to see the two programs being compatible, as iA Writer is also available for iPad and iPhone. As soon as Dropbox Support comes to UberWriter this might happen.

Features 

 Clean user interface
 A focus mode, which greys out all but the sentence you are actively working on
 Fullscreen mode
 Markdown syntax highlighting
 Live word and character counting
 Live preview mode
 Out-of-the-box math support
 Can export Markdown to OpenDocument (ODF), PDF, EPUB, Rich Text Format (RTF), HTML, LaTeX, and MediaWiki Markup

See also
List of text editors
Comparison of text editors
iA Writer

References

External links
 
 Apostrophe's repo on Gnome.org's GitLab instance
 Apostrophe on Flathub

Text editors
Text Editors
Text editors that use GTK